The Remittance Woman is a 1923 American silent drama film directed by Wesley Ruggles and starring Ethel Clayton, Rockliffe Fellowes, and Mario Carillo. A remittance man (or woman) was one sent away from home (usually Britain) to avoid shame on the family. The following year a book of the same title appeared, by American pulp author Achmed Abdullah.

Cast

Preservation
With no prints of The Remittance Woman located in any film archives, it is a lost film.

References

Bibliography
 Goble, Alan. The Complete Index to Literary Sources in Film. Walter de Gruyter, 1999.

External links

1923 films
1923 drama films
1920s English-language films
American silent feature films
Silent American drama films
Films directed by Wesley Ruggles
American black-and-white films
Film Booking Offices of America films
1920s American films